"Gli anni più belli" is a song composed by Claudio Baglioni, and performed by himself. With this song Baglioni returns to the music scene with an unpublished after four years: the last publication dates back to 2016.

The song gives the title to the film homonym.

Chart

References

2020 singles
2020 songs
Italian songs